Paul Barnes may refer to:

 Paul Barnes (musician) (1901–1981), American clarinetist and saxophonist
 Paul Barnes (pastor) (born 1954), former senior pastor of Grace Chapel in Douglas County, Colorado
 Paul Barnes (pianist) (born 1961), American pianist and Liszt specialist
 Paul Barnes (footballer) (born 1967), English footballer
 Paul Barnes (designer) (born 1970), prominent figure of modern UK graphic design
 Paul Barnes (songwriter) (1870–1922), vaudeville comedic actor, singer, pianist, and songwriter